The Bregenzer Ach (also: Bregenzer Ache) is the main river of the Bregenz Forest (Bregenzerwald), in the Austrian state of Vorarlberg. It is a tributary to Lake Constance, which is drained by the Rhine. The river is 67 kilometers long and drains almost the entire area of the Bregenz Forest. It has its source above the town of Schröcken, at an altitude of about 2400 meters.

References

Rivers of Vorarlberg
 
Rivers of Austria